Yolande Cornelia "Nikki" Giovanni Jr. (born June 7, 1943) is an American poet, writer, commentator, activist, and educator.  One of the world's most well-known African-American poets, her work includes poetry anthologies, poetry recordings, and nonfiction essays, and covers topics ranging from race and social issues to children's literature.  She has won numerous awards, including the Langston Hughes Medal and the NAACP Image Award.  She has been nominated for a Grammy Award for her poetry album, The Nikki Giovanni Poetry Collection. Additionally, she has been named as one of Oprah Winfrey's 25 "Living Legends".

Giovanni gained initial fame in the late 1960s as one of the foremost authors of the Black Arts Movement. Influenced by the Civil Rights Movement and Black Power Movement of the period, her early work provides a strong, militant African-American perspective, leading one writer to dub her the "Poet of the Black Revolution".  During the 1970s, she began writing children's literature, and co-founded a publishing company, NikTom Ltd, to provide an outlet for other African-American women writers. Over subsequent decades, her works discussed social issues, human relationships, and hip hop. Poems such as "Knoxville, Tennessee" and "Nikki-Rosa" have been frequently re-published in anthologies and other collections.

Giovanni has received numerous awards and holds 27 honorary degrees from various colleges and universities. She has also been given the key to over two dozen cities. Giovanni has been honored with the NAACP Image Award seven times. One of her more unique honors was having a South America bat species, Micronycteris giovanniae, named after her in 2007.

Giovanni is proud of her Appalachian roots and works to change the way the world views Appalachians and Affrilachians.

Giovanni has taught at Queens College, Rutgers, and Ohio State, and was a University Distinguished Professor at Virginia Tech until September 1, 2022. Following the Virginia Tech shooting in 2007, she delivered a chant-poem at a memorial for the shooting victims.

Life and work
Yolande Cornelia "Nikki" Giovanni Jr. was born in Knoxville, Tennessee, to Yolande Cornelia Sr. and Jones "Gus" Giovanni. Soon after her birth, the family moved to Cincinnati, Ohio where her parents worked at Glenview School. In 1948, the family moved to Wyoming, Ohio, and sometime in those first three years, Giovanni's sister, Gary, began calling her "Nikki." In 1958, Giovanni moved to Knoxville, TN to live with her grandparents and attend Austin High School. In 1960, she began her studies at her grandfather's alma mater, Fisk University in Nashville, Tennessee, as an "Early Entrant", which meant that she could enroll in college without having finished high school first. She immediately clashed with the Dean of Women, Ann Cheatam, and was expelled after neglecting to obtain the required permission from the Dean to leave campus and travel home for Thanksgiving break. Giovanni moved back to Knoxville, where she worked at a Walgreens drug store and helped care for her nephew, Christopher. In 1964, Giovanni spoke with the new Dean of Women at Fisk University, Blanche McConnell Cowan ("Jackie"), who urged her to return to Fisk that fall. While at Fisk, Giovanni edited a student literary journal (titled Élan), reinstated the campus chapter of SNCC (Student Non-Violent Coordinating Committee), and published an essay in Negro Digest on gender questions in the Movement. In 1967, she graduated with honors with a B.A. degree in history.

Soon after graduation, she suffered the loss of her grandmother, Louvenia Watson, and turned to writing to cope with her death. These poems would later be included in her collection Black Feelings, Black Talk. In 1968, Giovanni attended a semester at University of Pennsylvania School of Social Work toward an MSW and then moved to New York City. She  briefly attended Columbia University School of the Arts toward an MFA in poetry and privately published Black Feeling, Black Talk. In 1969, Giovanni began teaching at Livingston College of Rutgers University. She was an active member of the Black Arts Movement beginning in the late 1960s. In 1969, she gave birth to Thomas Watson Giovanni, her only child.

After the birth of her son, Giovanni was accused of setting a bad example because there were not many single moms at that time. Giovanni noted that the birth of her son helped her to realize that children have different interests and require different content than adults. This realization lead her to write six children's books.

In 1970, she began making regular appearances on the television program Soul!, an entertainment/variety/talk show that promoted black art and culture and allowed political expression. Soul! hosted important guests such as Muhammad Ali, James Baldwin, Jesse Jackson, Harry Belafonte, Sidney Poitier, Gladys Knight, Miriam Makeba, and Stevie Wonder. (In addition to being a "regular" on the show, Giovanni for several years helped design and produce episodes.) She published multiple poetry anthologies, children's books, and released spoken word albums from 1973 to 1987.

Since 1987, she has taught writing and literature at Virginia Tech, where she is a University Distinguished Professor. She has received the NAACP Image Award several times, received 20 honorary doctorates and various other awards, including the Rosa Parks and the Langston Hughes Award for Distinguished Contributions to Arts and Letters. She also holds the key to several different cities, including Dallas, Miami, New York City, and Los Angeles. She is a member of the Order of the Eastern Star (PHA), she has received the Life Membership and Scroll from the National Council of Negro Women, and is an Honorary Member of Delta Sigma Theta sorority.

Giovanni was diagnosed with lung cancer in the early 1990s and underwent numerous surgeries. Her book Blues: For All the Changes: New Poems, published in 1999, contains poems about nature and her battle with cancer. In 2002, Giovanni spoke in front of NASA about the need for African Americans to pursue space travel, and later published Quilting the Black-Eyed Pea: Poems and Not Quite Poems, which dealt with similar themes.

She has also been honored for her life and career by the HistoryMakers, along with being the first person to receive the Rosa L. Parks Women of Courage Award. She was awarded the Presidential Medal of Honor from Dillard University in 2010. In 2015, Giovanni was named one of the Library of Virginia's "Virginia Women in History" for her contributions to poetry, education, and society.

Giovanni gave an extended interview to Bryan Knight's Tell A Friend Podcast where she gave an assessment of her life and legacy.

Giovanni released a new album "The Gospel According to Nikki Giovanni" on February 8, 2022

Virginia Tech shooting
Seung-Hui Cho, a mass murderer who killed 32 people in the Virginia Tech shooting on April 16, 2007, was a student in one of Giovanni's poetry classes. Describing him as "mean" and "menacing", she approached the department chair to have Cho taken out of her class, and said she was willing to resign rather than continue teaching him. Cho was removed from her class in 2005. After the massacre, Giovanni stated that, upon hearing of the shooting, she immediately suspected that Cho might be the shooter.

Giovanni was asked by Virginia Tech president Charles Steger to give a convocation speech at the April 17 memorial service for the shooting victims (she was asked by Steger at 5:00 pm on the day of the shootings, giving her less than 24 hours to prepare the speech). She expressed that she usually feels very comfortable delivering speeches, but worried that her emotion would get the best of her. On April 17, 2007, at the Virginia Tech Convocation commemorating the April 16 massacre, Giovanni closed the ceremony with a chant poem, intoning: 

Her speech also sought to express the idea that really terrible things happen to good people: "I would call it, in terms of writing, in terms of poetry, it's a laundry list. Because all you're doing is: This is who we are, and this is what we think, and this is what we feel, and this is why - you know?... I just wanted to admit, you know, that we didn't deserve this, and nobody does. And so I wanted to link our tragedy, in every sense, you know - we're no different from anything else that has ...." 
 
She thought that ending with a thrice-repeated "We will prevail" would be anticlimactic, and she wanted to connect back with the beginning, for balance. So, shortly before going onstage, she added a closing: "We are Virginia Tech." Her performance produced a sense of unity and received a fifty-four second standing ovation from the over-capacity audience in Cassell Coliseum, including then-President George W. Bush.

Writing

The Civil Rights Movement and Black Power movements inspired her early poetry that was collected in Black Feeling, Black Talk (1968), which sold over ten thousand copies in its first year, in Black Judgement (1968), selling six thousand copies in three months, and in Re: Creation (1970). All three of these early works aided in establishing Giovanni as a new voice for African Americans.(30)  In "After Mecca": Women Poets and the Black Arts Movement, Cheryl Clarke cites Giovanni as a woman poet who became a significant part of the Civil Rights and Black Power Movement. Giovanni is commonly praised as one of the best African-American poets emerging from the 1960s Black Power and Black Arts Movements. Her early poems that were collected in the late 1960s and early 1970s are seen as radical as and more militant than her later work. Her poetry is described as being "politically, spiritually, and socially aware". Evie Shockley describes Giovanni as "epitomizing the defiant, unapologetically political, unabashedly Afrocentric, BAM ethos". Her work is described as conveying "urgency in expressing the need for Black awareness, unity, [and] solidarity."  Likewise, Giovanni's early work has been considered to be "polemic" and "incendiary". Examples of poems in which she vehemently advocated for change include "The True Import of Present Dialogue Black vs. Negro" (1968), "Poem for Black Boys" (1968) and "A Litany for Peppe" (1970).

Not only did Giovanni write about racial equality, but she also advocated for gender equality, as well.  In fact, Odon states that "Giovanni’s realignment of female identity with sexuality is crucial to the burgeoning feminist movement within the black community."  In the poem, "Revolutionary Dreams" (1970), Giovanni discusses gender and objectification.  She writes, "Woman doing what a woman/Does when she’s natural/I would have a revolution" (lines 14–16) Another example of a poem that encourages sexual equality is "Woman Poem" (1968).  In "Woman Poem," Giovanni shows that the Black Arts Movement and racial pride were not as liberating for women as they were for men (Virginia Fowler, Introduction to theCollected Works of Nikki Giovanni).  In "Woman Poem," Giovanni describes how pretty women become sex objects "and no love/or love and no sex if you’re fat/get back fat black woman be a mother/grandmother strong thing but not woman."

Giovanni herself takes great pride in being a "Black American, a daughter, mother, and a Professor of English". Giovanni is also known for her use of African American Vernacular English. She has since written more than two dozen books, including volumes of poetry, illustrated children's books, and three collections of essays. Her work is said to speak to all ages, and she strives to make her work easily accessible and understood by both adults and children. (29)  Her writing, heavily inspired by African-American activists and artists, also reflects the influences of issues of race, gender, sexuality, and the African-American family. Her book Love Poems (1997) was written in memory of Tupac Shakur, and she has stated that she would "rather be with the thugs than the people who are complaining about them." Additionally, in 2007 she wrote a children's picture book titled Rosa, which centers on the life of Civil Rights leader Rosa Parks. In addition to this book reaching number three on the New York Best Seller list, it also received the Caldecott Honors Award, and its illustrator, Brian Collier, received the Coretta Scott King Award.

Giovanni's poetry reaches more readership through her active engagement with live audiences. She gave her first public reading at the New York City jazz spot, Birdland. Her public expression of "oppression, anger, and solidarity" as well as her political activism allow her to reach more than just the poetic circles. After the birth of her son in 1969, Giovanni recorded several of her poems with a musical backdrop of jazz and gospel. She began to travel all around the world and speak and read to a wider audience. Even though Giovanni's earlier works were known to carry a militant, revolutionary tone, Giovanni communicated "a global sense of solidarity amongst oppressed peoples in the world" in her travels. It is in this sense of human unity in which Giovanni aligns herself with the beliefs of Martin Luther King, Jr. Like King, Giovanni believes a unified, collective government must be made up of the everyday, ordinary citizen, regardless of race, ethnicity, or gender. In the 1970s and '80s her popularity as a speaker increased even more. In 1972 Giovanni interviewed Muhammad Ali on Soul!

Giovanni is often interviewed regarding themes pertaining to her poetry such as gender and race. In an interview entitled "I am Black, Female, Polite", Peter Bailey questions her regarding the role of gender and race in the poetry she writes. Bailey specifically addresses the critically acclaimed poem "Nikki-Rosa," and questions whether it is reflective of the poet's own childhood and her experiences in her community. In the interview, Giovanni stresses that she did not like constantly reading the trope of the black family as a tragedy and that "Nikki-Rosa" demonstrates the experiences that she witnessed in her communities. For example, Giovanni writes about her happy childhood as: "Black love is Black wealth and they’ll/probably talk about my hard childhood/and never understand that/all the while I was quite happy" (lines 30–33)
Specifically, the poem deals with black folk culture and touches on such gender, race, and social issues as alcoholism and domestic violence and not having an indoor bathroom.

Giovanni's poetry in the late 1960s and early 1970s addressed black womanhood and black manhood among other themes. In a book she co-wrote with James Baldwin entitled A Dialogue, the two authors speak blatantly about the status of the black male in the household. Baldwin challenges Giovanni's opinion on the representation of black women as the "breadwinners" in the household. Baldwin states: "A man is not a woman. And whether he's wrong or right... Look, if we're living in the same house and you're my wife or my woman, I have to be responsible for that house." Conversely, Giovanni recognizes the black man's strength, whether or not he is "responsible" for the home or economically advantaged. The interview makes it clear that regardless of who is "responsible" for the home, the black woman and the black man should be dependent on one another. In a 1972 Soul! interview with Mohammed Ali, Giovanni uses her popularity as a speaker to a broader audience to read some of her essay "Gemini" from her book, Gemini.  In the excerpt from that essay, Giovanni intones, "we are born men and women...we need some happiness in our lives, some hope, some love...I really like to think a black, beautiful loving world is possible." Such themes appeared throughout her early poetry which focused on race and gender dynamics in the black community.

Giovanni tours nationwide and frequently speaks out against hate-motivated violence. At a 1999 Martin Luther King Day event, she recalled the 1998 murders of James Byrd, Jr. and Matthew Shepard: "What's the difference between dragging a black man behind a truck in Jasper, Texas, and beating a white boy to death in Wyoming because he's gay?"

Those Who Ride the Night Winds (1983) acknowledged black figures. Giovanni collected her essays in the 1988 volume Sacred Cows ... and Other Edibles. Her more recent works include Acolytes, a collection of 80 new poems, and On My Journey Now. Acolytes is her first published volume since her 2003 Collected Poems. The work is a celebration of love and recollection directed at friends and loved ones, and it recalls memories of nature, theater, and the glories of children. However, Giovanni's fiery persona still remains a constant undercurrent in Acolytes, as some of the most serious verse links her own life struggles (being a black woman and a cancer survivor) to the wider frame of African-American history and the continual fight for equality.

Giovanni's collection Bicycles: Love Poems (2009) is a companion work to her 1997 Love Poems. Both works touch on the deaths of her mother, her sister, and those massacred on the Virginia Tech campus. "Tragedy and trauma are the wheels" of the bicycle. The first poem ("Blacksburg Under Siege: 21 August 2006") and the last poem ("We Are Virginia Tech") reflect this. Giovanni chose the title of the collection as a metaphor for love itself, "because love requires trust and balance."

In Chasing Utopia: A Hybrid (2013), Giovanni describes falling off of a bike and her mother saying, "Come here, Nikki and I will pick you up." She has explained that it was comforting to hear her mother say this, and that "it took me the longest to realize – no, she made me get up myself." Chasing Utopia continues as a hybrid (poetry and prose) work about food as a metaphor and as a connection to the memory of her mother, sister, and grandmother. The theme of the work is love relationships.

In 2004, Giovanni was nominated for the Grammy Award for Best Spoken Word Album at the 46th Annual Grammy Awards for her album The Nikki Giovanni Poetry Collection. This was a collection of poems that she read against the backdrop of gospel music.(29)  She also featured on the track "Ego Trip by Nikki Giovanni" on Blackalicious's 2000 album Nia. In November 2008, a song cycle of her poems, Sounds That Shatter the Staleness in Lives by Adam Hill, was premiered as part of the Soundscapes Chamber Music Series in Taos, New Mexico.

She was commissioned by National Public Radio's All Things Considered to create an inaugural poem for President Barack Obama.  The poem, entitled "Roll Call: A Song of Celebration," ends with the following enthusiastic, optimistic three lines: "Yes We Can/Yes We Can/Yes We Can."
 Giovanni read poetry at the Lincoln Memorial as a part of the bi-centennial celebration of Lincoln's birth on February 12, 2009.

Giovanni was part of the 2016 Writer's Symposium by the Sea at Loma Nazarene University. The University of California Television (UCTV) published the readings of Giovanni at the symposium. In October 2017 Giovanni published her newest collection A Good Cry: What We Learn From Tears and Laughter. This collection includes poems that pay homage to the greatest influences on her life who have passed away, including close friend Maya Angelou who died in 2014. Giovanni often reads from her books. In one reading she shares her poem, "I Married My Mother." In 2017, Giovanni presented at a TEDx event. Here she read the poem, "My Sister and Me." She called herself and her sister "Two little chocolate girls." After reading the poems she states, "Sometimes you write a poem because damnit, you want to."

Awards 
Sources:

Eponym 
Giovanni's Big-Eared Bat, also known as Micronycteris giovanniae, was named in her honor in 2007. The bat is found in western Ecuador and the naming was given "in recognition of her poetry and writings".

Works

Poetry collections
Black Feeling, Black Talk (1968)
Black Judgement (1968)
Re: Creation (1970)
Black Feeling, Black Talk/ Black Judgement (contains Black Feeling, Black Talk, and Black Judgement) (1970)
My House (1972)
The Women and The Men (1975)
Cotton Candy on a Rainy Day (1978)
Woman (1978)
Those Who Ride The Night Winds (1983)
Knoxville, Tennessee (1994)
The Selected Poems of Nikki Giovanni (1996) 
Love Poems (1997)
Blues: For All the Changes (1999)
Quilting the Black-Eyed Pea: Poems and Not Quite Poems (2002)
The Prosaic Soul of Nikki Giovanni (2003)
The Collected Poetry of Nikki Giovanni: 1968-1998 (2003)
Acolytes (2007)
Bicycles: Love Poems (2009) (William Morrow)
100 Best African American Poems (2010) [editor] (Sourcebooks MediaFusion)
Chasing Utopia: A Hybrid (2013) (HarperCollins)
Make Me Rain (2020)

Children's books
Spin a Soft Black Song (1971)
Ego-Tripping and Other Poems For Young People (1973)
Vacation Time: Poems for Children (1980)
 Ego-Tripping and Other Poems for Young People Revised Edition (1993)
The Genie in The Jar (1996)
The Sun Is So Quiet (1996)
The Girls in the Circle (Just for You!) (2004)Rosa* (2005)Poetry Speaks to Children: A Celebration of Poetry with a Beat (2005) [advisory editor] (Sourcebooks)Lincoln and Douglass: An American Friendship  (2008)Hip Hop Speaks to Children: A Celebration of Poetry with a Beat (2008) (Sourcebooks)The Grasshopper's Song: An Aesop's Fable  (2008)I Am Loved (2018)

DiscographyTruth Is On Its Way (Right-On Records, 1971)Like a Ripple on a Pond (Niktom, 1973)The Way I Feel (Niktom, 1975)The Reason I Like Chocolate (Folkways Records, 1976)Legacies: The Poetry of Nikki Giovanni (Folkways, 1976)Cotton Candy on a Rainy Day (Folkways, 1978)Nikki Giovanni and the New York Community Choir* (Collectibles, 1993)Every Tone A Testimony (Smithsonian Folkways, 2001)
 The Nikki Giovanni Poetry Collection (2002)

Other
(Editor) Night Comes Softly: An Anthology of Black Female Voices, Medic Press (1970)Gemini: An Extended Autobiographical Statement on My First Twenty-five Years of Being a Black Poet (1971)A Dialogue with James Baldwin (1973)
(With Margaret Walker) A Poetic Equation: Conversations between Nikki Giovanni and Margaret Walker (1974)
(Author of introduction) Adele Sebastian: Intro to Fine (poems), Woman in the Moon (1985)
Sacred Cows ... and Other Edibles (essays) (1988)
(Editor, with C. Dennison) Appalachian Elders: A Warm Hearth Sampler (1991)
(Author of foreword) The Abandoned Baobob: The Autobiography of a Woman (1991)
Racism 101* (essays, 1994)
(Editor) Grand Mothers: Poems, Reminiscences, and Short Stories about the Keepers of Our Traditions (1994)
(Editor) Shimmy Shimmy Shimmy Like My Sister Kate: Looking at the Harlem Renaissance through Poems (1995)
 (Editor) 100 Best African American Poems (2010)
 (Afterword) Continuum: New and Selected Poems by Mari Evans (2012)
 (Foreword) Heav'nly Tidings From the Afric Muse: The Grace and Genius of Phillis Wheatley by Richard Kigel (2017)(Foreword) 
(Featured Artist) Artemis 2017 (Academic Journal of southwest Virginia) (2017)
 (Foreword) Black Ink: Literary Legends on the Peril, Power, and Pleasure of Reading and Writing (2018)

References

External links

 Giovanni's website
 Profile at Lavin

 Profile and poems of Nikki Giovanni at the Poetry Foundation.
 Nikki Giovanni: Profile and Poems at Poets.org
 Giovanni Discography at Smithsonian Folkways
 "Interview with poet Nikki Giovanni" for the WGBH series Say Brother

Booknotes interview with Giovanni on The Collected Poetry of Nikki Giovanni: 1968-1998, February 8, 2004.
"Pin His Ear to the Wisdom Post". Nikki Giovanni named the first Coretta Scott King Fellow, video, April 3, 2009
 "We are Virginia Tech" - convocation poem read by Giovanni
MSNBC video
MP3 Audio
Amy Goodman sits down with activist, poet and scholar Nikki Giovanni at Virginia Tech, October 3, 2012, on Democracy Now!
Nikki Giovanni on 1 Year Since Newtown: Where is the Political Leadership on Gun Control?, December 16, 2013, on Democracy Now!
Nikki Giovanni on Poetry, Grief and Her New Book, "Chasing Utopia: A Hybrid",  December 16, 2013, on Democracy Now!
 Claire McIntosh, "8 Lessons From Nikki Giovanni That Will Change Your Life", Sisters
 In Black America; Nikki Giovanni: Portrait of a Contemporary Writer, KUT radio interview, 1981-03-19, at American Archive of Public Broadcasting
 Meet 5 People Who Complicate The Narrative About What It Means To Be Appalachian radio interview, October 11, 2019 West Virginia Public Broadcasting
 Poet Nikki Giovanni Says W.Va. Should Be Celebrated radio interview, October 16, 2015 West Virginia Public Broadcasting

1943 births
Living people
20th-century American poets
20th-century American women writers
21st-century American poets
21st-century American women writers
African-American poets
American women poets
American Book Award winners
Black Arts Movement writers
Carter G. Woodson Book Award winners
Children's poets
Delta Sigma Theta members
Fisk University alumni
People from Knoxville, Tennessee
Rutgers University faculty
Virginia Tech faculty
Writers from Tennessee
Writers from Ohio
American women academics
20th-century African-American women writers
20th-century African-American writers
21st-century African-American women writers
21st-century African-American writers
Affrilachian Poets
Affrilachian writers